Pavlo Serhiyovych Ksyonz (born 2 January 1987) is a Ukrainian professional footballer who plays for Mazovia Mińsk Mazowiecki.

Career
He transferred from FC Zakarpattia Uzhhorod during the 2010 winter transfer season.

Honors
UEFA Europa League runner-up (1) 2014–15

External links 
Profile on Zakarpattia Official Website
Profile on Official Illychivets Website
 
 

1987 births
Living people
People from Myrhorod
Ukrainian footballers
Ukraine international footballers
Ukrainian Premier League players
Ukrainian First League players
Ukrainian Second League players
Ukrainian expatriate footballers
Ekstraklasa players
Expatriate footballers in Poland
Ukrainian expatriate sportspeople in Poland
FC Dynamo Kyiv players
FC Dynamo-2 Kyiv players
FC Dynamo-3 Kyiv players
FC Mariupol players
FC Hoverla Uzhhorod players
FC CSKA Kyiv players
FC Kharkiv players
FC Oleksandriya players
FC Karpaty Lviv players
FC Metalist Kharkiv players
FC Dnipro players
Sandecja Nowy Sącz players
FC Olimpik Donetsk players
FC VPK-Ahro Shevchenkivka players
FC Livyi Bereh Kyiv players
Association football midfielders
Association football forwards
Ukraine youth international footballers
Sportspeople from Poltava Oblast
21st-century Ukrainian people